James Berg is an American television producer and writer. He has written for many television series including The Golden Girls, Roseanne and Gilmore Girls and the 1996 feature film A Very Brady Sequel. He has frequently collaborated with fellow producer and writer Stan Zimmerman. Berg and Zimmerman were also the creators and executive producers of the sitcom, Rita Rocks, starring Nicole Sullivan and Tisha Campbell-Martin which ran on Lifetime Television.

Berg and Zimmerman received two WGA nominations  - one for The Golden Girls, "Rose's Mother" and one for the lesbian kiss episode of Roseanne, "Don't Ask, Don't Tell".

His other television writing credits include Brothers, Just Our Luck, George Burns Comedy Week, Hooperman, Something Wilder, Fame, and Wanda at Large.

Berg is currently, as of 2018, working on the series Silver Foxes. The pilot is based on the documentary Gen Silent, about LGBT seniors forced to live in the closet to handle bureaucratic discrimination. Described as a "gay male Golden Girls, it has been picked up by Super Deluxe. It is co-written with Zimmerman, who also previously worked together as writers on Rita Rocks, Golden Girls, and Gilmore Girls.

Personal life
He is openly gay.

References

External links

American male screenwriters
American television producers
American television writers
American gay writers
American LGBT screenwriters
LGBT television producers
American male television writers
Living people
Place of birth missing (living people)
Year of birth missing (living people)